Hualpén is a Chilean city and commune belonging to Concepción Province and the Biobío Region. It is part of the conurbation of Greater Concepción.

Demographics
According to the 2002 census of the National Statistics Institute, Hualpén had 86,722 inhabitants. Of these, 85,928 (99.1%) lived in urban areas and 794 (0.9%) in rural areas. The population fell by 5.7% (5,239 persons) between the 1992 and 2002 censuses.

Administration
As a commune, Hualpén is a third-level administrative division of Chile administered by a municipal council, headed by an alcalde ("alcalde" in Spanish; alcalde and major, in English) who is directly elected every four years. The current major is Felipe Figueroa

Within the electoral divisions of Chile, Hualpén is represented in the Chamber of Deputies by Jorge Ulloa (UDI) and Cristián Campos (PDC) as part of the 43rd electoral district, (together with Talcahuano). The commune is represented in the Senate by Alejandro Navarro Brain (MAS) and Hosain Sabag Castillo (PDC) as part of the 12th senatorial constituency (Biobío-Cordillera).

See also
Acanthogonatus hualpen

Illustrious People

References

External links
  Municipality of Hualpén

Communes of Chile
Populated places in Concepción Province
2004 establishments in Chile